Café Europe, Café d'Europe or also Café Europa was a cultural initiative of the Austrian presidency of the European Union, held on Europe Day (9 May 2006) in 27 cafés of the capitals of the then 25 EU member states and the two countries which would join the Union in 2007. Vienna, the capital of Austria, is well known for its long and vibrant café culture, dating back from the first introduction of coffee to Europe as a result of the trade with the Ottoman Empire via Italy in the 16th and 17th centuries.

Sweet Europe

The initiative also included a presentation, called Sweet Europe, of typical sweets and cakes of every member state.

External links
Official site

Notes

2006 in the European Union
European cuisine